Cast is a commune in the Finistère department of Brittany in north-western France.

Population
Inhabitants of Cast are called in French Castois.

See also
Communes of the Finistère department
Roland Doré sculptor

References

External links

Official website 

 Mayors of Finistère Association  

Communes of Finistère